The Aron is a  long river in central France. It is a right tributary of the Loire, which it meets at Decize. It flows through the department of Nièvre.

Course
It flows in a southerly direction, through the towns of Châtillon-en-Bazois and Cercy-la-Tour, and empties into the Loire at Decize. For much of its length, from Châtillon-en-Bazois to Decize, the river flows parallel to the Canal du Nivernais.

Among its tributaries is the Alène.

References

Rivers of France
Rivers of Bourgogne-Franche-Comté
Rivers of Nièvre